Falard Rural District is in Falard District of Lordegan County, Chaharmahal and Bakhtiari province, Iran. At the census of 2006, its population was 18,723 in 3,816 households; there were 19,671 inhabitants in 4,914 households at the following census of 2011; and in the most recent census of 2016, the population of the rural district was 19,918 in 5,589 households. The largest of its 34 villages was Shahriar, with 2,076 people.

References 

Lordegan County

Rural Districts of Chaharmahal and Bakhtiari Province

Populated places in Chaharmahal and Bakhtiari Province

Populated places in Lordegan County